Schlitterbahn is an American brand of water parks and resorts owned by Cedar Fair. It was previously a company family-owned-and-operated by the Henry family that was based in New Braunfels, Texas. Schlitterbahn opened its first location, Schlitterbahn Waterpark Resort, in 1979. At its peak, the company consisted of five outdoor waterparks, two indoor waterparks, and three resorts.

Schlitterbahn's outdoor water parks are seasonally-operated, typically open from late April through mid-September, while its indoor locations operate year-round. Two parks are located in Texas.

On June 13, 2019, Cedar Fair entered an agreement to acquire two of Schlitterbahn's properties in Galveston and New Braunfels for $261 million. The deal, which closed in early July 2019, gave Cedar Fair the option to purchase Schlitterbahn Waterpark Kansas City for $6 million within 120 days of the transaction, which Cedar Fair declined to do. Additionally, the rights to the Schlitterbahn name were included in the acquisition.

Current parks

New Braunfels, Texas

The first of the parks was in New Braunfels and opened in 1979. The park was named Schlitterbahn ("slippery road" in German) because of the local area's German heritage. It originally consisted of four waterslides. The park expanded three times. Surfenberg was the first part of the expansion and had the world's first inland surfing ride, the Boogie Bahn, in 1992, created the first uphill water coaster, the Dragon Blaster in 1994. In 1996 the next section opened - Blastenhoff - and featured the world's first wave river, the Torrent, and the world's most award-winning uphill water coaster, the Master Blaster. In 2011, the park expanded again, adding The Falls, the world's longest tubing river, featuring rapids and tube chutes.

As of 2022, the park has won Amusement Today's Golden Ticket Award for Best Waterpark for 24 years straight; the streak began with the inception of the award. In total, Schlitterbahn New Braunfels has received 42 Golden Ticket Awards. As of 2014, the park employed 2,000 seasonal workers.

Galveston, Texas

The 26-acre Schlitterbahn park in Galveston opened in 2006, and is open for part of every month of the year. The park features the most thrill rides of any of the Schlitterbahn parks and is home to the world's former record holder of the world's tallest water coaster, MASSIV, as it lost its record to Tsunami Surge at Hurricane Harbor Chicago at 86 feet tall. MASSIV opened in 2016 and features the most current technology including water and power saving features never used before.

Former parks

South Padre Island, Texas

The park in South Padre Island opened in 2001. An indoor section opened in 2012. The park features Transportainment - a system where guests can ride through the majority of the park's attractions while floating in their tubes. In fact, this park has floating queue lines for three of the four uphill water coasters. When the Henrys sold the company to Cedar Fair, they retained the ownership of this property and rebranded it. The park was rebranded as Beach Park at Isla Blanca in December 2019.

Corpus Christi, Texas

In May 2012, Schlitterbahn announced that it would move forward with plans to begin construction of a new water park in the Corpus Christi-Padre Island area. It was announced that it would open during the summer of 2013, but due to various delays groundbreaking didn't take place until February 2013. A 574-acre plan for the city includes a marina, the Schlitterbahn water park with lodging, and a golf course. Vendors complained, and even sued, Schlitterbahn over $500,000 in unpaid bills on the Corpus Christi project. After several months, Schlitterbahn paid the vendors and threw them a party. 
Schlitterbahn Corpus Christi opened on June 20, 2015, with a full-service restaurant, the Veranda, two kids areas, the Krystal river system, the Sky Blaster and the Aquaveyer.  In 2016 the southern end of the park opened along with a resort. Christened Schlitterbahn Riverpark - Corpus Christi, the park features nearly 2 miles of river and multiple blasters. In 2017 Padre's Plunge, a SkyTrans Manufacturing Shoot the Chute, opened in the southern end of the park. It had previously operated as "Buzzsaw Falls" at Alabama Splash Adventure. This park features four types of rivers, two children's area, a massive swim-up bar, a stage for concerts, a resort with several event spaces, and a full-service restaurant. 

On May 1, 2018, IBC Bank took over ownership of the park at foreclosure auction. Schlitterbahn continues to operate and market it for the new owner.  The property was rebranded as Waves Resort Corpus Christi. After not operating during 2020 due to the COVID-19 pandemic, the park was closed. The owners intend to demolish it for a mixed-use development.

Kansas City, Kansas

The first phase of the park opened in July 2009. The park opened each year in May. After an accident in 2016 that resulted in a death, Cedar Fair elected not to purchase the property along with the other Schlitterbahn parks. The park did not open in the 2019 season and the park was completely demolished in 2021.

Proposed projects

Fort Lauderdale, Florida
A long-stalled project in Fort Lauderdale, Florida, Schlitterbahn received final approval from the Federal Aviation Administration to construct a 64-acre water park at the old Fort Lauderdale Stadium. The initial project would have used portions of the old stadium to construct a castle-like entrance to include lodging, dining and shopping facilities. Other projects included incorporating the neighboring Lockhart Stadium into the plan by expanding the park around that stadium.

A lawsuit between Fort Lauderdale and nearby Rapids Water Park delayed the project. On March 29, 2017, federal U.S. District Judge Jose Martinez ruled against the City of Fort Lauderdale in the case stating they "did not follow their own charter" in awarding the property lease to Schlitterbahn without conducting a competitive bid process and declared the lease "invalid, null and void."

Premier Parks, LLC eventually won the bid for the project with plans to build a Wet'n'Wild brand water park on the site. However, in September 2018, the CEO of Premier, Kieran Burke, cancelled the deal.

Cedar Park, Texas
While the Henry Family owned and operated the chain, there were plans for a waterpark in Cedar Park, Texas.

Incidents

On March 6, 2013, Nicolas "Nico" Benavidez, a 20-year-old seasonal employee at Schlitterbahn South Padre Island, was fatally injured and a maintenance supervisor seriously injured when a wave generation machine they were inside for maintenance was activated, crushing them between the gate of the machine and the wall. He was left on life support for organ donation and later died from the injuries on March 11. OSHA investigated and fined Schlitterbahn $96,000 for six safety violations related to the fatal incident.
On August 7, 2016, 10-year-old Caleb Thomas Schwab, son of Kansas representative Scott Schwab, was decapitated while riding the Verrückt, a water raft ride touted as the world's tallest water slide. He died before reaching the bottom. Two other unrelated riders in the same raft sustained injuries. The ride was decommissioned and later demolished. The park settled with all parties in 2016. In March 2018, a Wyandotte County grand jury filed indictments against the park and three employees, including the co-owner, Verrückt's designer and a former park executive. The indictment accused the park and its employees of negligence, as well as concealing design flaws and other issues with the ride. On February 22, 2019, all charges were dropped by Judge Robert Burns against the construction company and Schlitterbahn owners due to prosecutorial misconduct.

In popular culture
The Ewing family had a day out at the Schlitterbahn Water Park in New Braunfels, Texas in an episode of Dallas titled "Shadow of a Doubt", which originally aired on November 2, 1984.

References

External links

Water parks in Texas
Defunct companies based in Texas
Cedar Fair
Tourist attractions in Galveston, Texas
Tourist attractions in Cameron County, Texas
1979 establishments in Texas
Amusement parks opened in 1979
Companies based in New Braunfels, Texas